Jaipal may refer to:

Jaipal Reddy, Indian Minister
Jaipal Singh, Former Indian Hockey Captain
 Jayapala, 10th-century founder of Hindu Shahi dynasty in eastern Afghanistan and northwest Pakistan.

Indian masculine given names